Vitali Shotayevich Chochiyev (born 17 December 1979) is a former Russian professional footballer.

Club career
He made his debut in the Russian Premier League in 2001 for FC Alania Vladikavkaz.

References

1979 births
People from Beslan
Living people
Russian footballers
Russia under-21 international footballers
Association football midfielders
FC Spartak Vladikavkaz players
FC KAMAZ Naberezhnye Chelny players
FC Kuban Krasnodar players
FC Shinnik Yaroslavl players
FC Salyut Belgorod players
Russian Premier League players
FC Volgar Astrakhan players
Sportspeople from North Ossetia–Alania